Nike Hawk is the designation of an American sounding rocket. It has an apogee of 160 km, a liftoff thrust of 217 kN, a total mass of 1100 kg and a total length of 9.00 m.
It is a two-stage rocket made from a Nike and a Hawk anti-aircraft missile motor, and was designed to launch a 90-kg research payload to an altitude of 160 km.

References

External links
More information about Nike Hawk (part way down)

Nike (rocket family)

de:Nike Hawk